Minuit, le soir is a character-driven Quebec television show. Set and shot in Montreal, the 30-minute show revolves around the lives of three bouncers, both in private and at work. The show is notable for its portrayal of the daily hardships facing each of the principal characters. Gritty cinematography and fast-paced direction are also key elements of the show's style. All the show's episodes were directed by Daniel Grou (aka Podz).

Aired by public broadcaster Radio-Canada, the show achieved critical acclaim in local media 
and among viewers, reaching on average 1.3 million people during its first season. Minuit, le soir eventually won 17 Gémeaux Awards for its three seasons, the local equivalent of the American Emmys, the Geminis in other Canadian provinces or the British Academy Television Awards.

The title of the show evokes the bouncers' work cycle and the fact they work at night. Although title screens and promotional logos do not include the comma between minuit and le, it does appears officially in the show's title.

Minuit, le soir aired for three seasons, ending its run in 2007.

Plot
Minuit, le soir is a series about three nightclub bouncers at The Manhattan, a fictional bar set in downtown Montreal. At first, all three seem successful: they enjoy working together and feel comfortable, achieving the rough-and-tough persona of the stereotypical bouncer. In an unexpected move, their aging boss sells his bar to an up-and-coming Italian-Canadian nightclub owner, after more than some insistence on her part.

Citing better standards she fires all three main protagonists. She intends on increasing the appeal of the bar by employing inexperienced yet good-looking young men to fill their positions. Nonetheless, one of the terminated bouncers successfully convinces the new owner to reinstate all three employees, showing their love for the job and indispensable experience. After reassembling her team of bouncers, the new owner renames the bar to Le Sas (The Airlock) and assigns the doormen to her other nightclubs in the city, including Le Joystick, a gay BDSM venue.

Minuit, le soir follows the characters working and off the job. The three bouncers are usually shown together being that they are coworkers and lifelong friends. The venues include the various bars, a park where the men procrastinate and their respective apartments.

The show evolves quite rapidly, both visually and story-wise, given its half-hour format combined to a dramatic plot. The camera is at times nervous, at times fluid and often transitions through tracking shots of the city.

Music is a central part of the show. In the club scenes, pounding house, mostly written by Mathieu Desaulniers, DJ Kal & Marco G. In the key moments, a haunting cello-based score written by Nicolas Maranda often takes over. The team won the 2007 Gémeaux award for their efforts. The music also promotes local artists by playing their songs during club scenes.

Characters

Principals
 Marc Forest (Claude Legault): Forest (nicknamed "P'tit") is a tough doorman who initially handles the nightclub's unwanteds. He is revealed as a sensitive man concerned with his friends, the bar's customers and—eventually—his new boss, Fanny. An ongoing quirk of the show, Marc seems to be unable to keep his pets alive; they all die in rather weird circumstances and he buries them in his backyard. He also cannot keep a woman overnight and he uses noisy tapes to scare them away after they've had sex.
 Gaétan Langlois (Julien Poulin): Gaétan (nicknamed "Vieux") is the eldest of the bouncers, a simple and honest man in his fifties. Concerned with his image in a world of beauty and youthfulness, Gaétan tries to fit in. He, for example, removes his glasses while working, a clear negligence considering the importance of eyesight in his profession. During the first season, Gaétan reveals to his friends he is illiterate—an issue unveiled on screen by morphing all the letters in Gaétan's view with unintelligible symbols. He also falls in love with a high-class escort, many times his junior.
 Louis Bergeron (Louis Champagne): Louis (nicknamed "Gros") is the third member of the team of bouncers and the funny guy among them. Concerned with his weight, he also has trouble keeping a stable relationship. He breaks up with his girlfriend Sylviane during the first season, notably because of a costume fetish. Louis also works for the city's public works in the daytime. He portrays a widespread cliché among the Québécois that Montréal public workers (the cols bleus, literally blue collars) never actually work. His remarks concerning working hours, unionism and attendance often provoke laughter among his friends—and the audience.
 Fanny Campagnolo (Julie Perreault): Fanny is the nightclub owner. Born and raised in an Italian-Canadian family, she initially buys one of her bars from her father, in whose steps she evolves. Somewhat naïve, she makes various business and personal decisions that deeply affect her self-esteem and resolve.

Supporting
 Yan (Stéphane Gagnon) and Stevie (Henri Prado), the younger bouncers
 Brigitte (Julie Le Breton), the escort
 Sylviane (France Parent), Louis's ex-girlfriend
 James (James Gill), the bartender
 Paolo Campagnolo (Dino Tavarone), Fanny's father

Awards
Minuit, le soir won a total of 17 Gémeaux Awards :

2005 (first season)
 Best Lead Actor in a Drama Series for Claude Legault
 Best Editing for a Series

2006 (second season)
 Best Drama Series
 Best Lead Actor in a Drama Series for Claude Legault
 Best Directing for a Drama Series
 Best Writing for a Drama Series
 Best Editing for a Series
 Best Cinematography for a Series
 Best Art Direction for All Categories
 Jean-Besré Award

2007 (third season)
 Best Drama Series
 Best Supporting Actor in a Drama Series for Julien Poulin
 Best Directing for a Drama Series
 Best Writing for a Drama Series
 Best Editing for a Series
 Best Sound for a Series
 Best Original Music Score for a Series

References

External links
   Official website
 

Television shows set in Montreal
Television shows filmed in Montreal
Ici Radio-Canada Télé original programming
Prix Gémeaux-winning shows
2005 Canadian television series debuts
2007 Canadian television series endings
2000s Canadian drama television series